The Men's madison competition at the 2021 UCI Track Cycling World Championships was held on 24 October 2021.

Results
The race was started at 14:57. 200 laps (50 km) with 20 sprints were raced.

References

Men's madison